This is a list of the races calendar in FIS Alpine Ski World Cup from 1967 to present.

World Cup timeline

Last updated: 20 March 2022

References

External links

Races calendar